Srinivasaraghavan Venkataraghavan ( (informally Venkat, born 21 April 1945) is an Indian former cricketer. He captained the Indian cricket team at the first two ICC Cricket World Cups, and later became an umpire on the elite International Cricket Council Test panel. His Test career was one of the longest for any Indian player. He also played for Derbyshire in English county cricket from 1973 to 1975. A qualified engineer and an alumnus of Chennai's famed College of Engineering, Guindy, he is a recipient of the civilian honour of Padma Shri in 2003.

Playing career
An off spin bowler, he was one of the famed Indian quartet of spin bowlers in the 1970s (the others being Bhagwat Chandrasekhar, Bishan Singh Bedi and Erapalli Prasanna). He was also a useful tail-end batsman and strong at close fielding. Venkat came on to the Test scene at the age of 20 when he was selected to play against the touring New Zealand side. By the end of the series he had emerged as a world-class spinner, taking 12 wickets in the Delhi test that led India to victory. He was the vice-captain of the Indian team that toured the West Indies and England in 1970–71. India won both series. Venkat played an important role, claiming five wickets in the Trinidad Test and 13 wickets in the three Tests in England. He captained India in both the 1975 and 1979 World Cup competitions. He also led India in a four-Test series against England in 1979. In domestic cricket, he led South Zone and Tamil Nadu for over a decade.

Venkat retired from first-class cricket in 1985. He became a cricket administrator and managed the Indian Test side. He was honoured with the Padma Shri in 2003.

Umpiring career 

Venkat made his international umpiring debut in the One Day International between India and England at Jaipur on 18 January 1993. He made his Test umpiring debut in the same month, with the match between India and England at Kolkata. He gained a place on the inaugural International Umpire Panel when it was formed in 1994, and was selected by the International Cricket Council on a regular basis to umpire in Test matches away from home as the neutral umpire. In 2002 the ICC created an Elite Panel of the top eight umpires, who were employed on a full-time basis and would cover all Test match officiating. Venkat was duly included in the inaugural Elite Panel, of which he remained a member until his retirement in January 2004.

The highlights of his umpiring career include six Ashes Tests and appointments to three World Cups in 1996, 1999 and 2003. In both the 1996 and 1999 tournaments he was appointed to stand in a semi-final, and was the third umpire of the 1999 World Cup final between Australia and Pakistan at Lord's. In total he officiated on-field in 73 Test matches and 52 One-day Internationals during his career.

Education
Venkataraghavan is an engineering graduate from Madras University.

See also
 List of Test cricket umpires
 List of One Day International cricket umpires

References

External links

1945 births
Living people
Indian Test cricket umpires
Indian One Day International cricket umpires
India One Day International cricketers
India Test cricketers
India Test cricket captains
Indian cricketers
Derbyshire cricketers
South Zone cricketers
Tamil Nadu cricketers
Vazir Sultan Tobacco cricketers
Indian Universities cricketers
Recipients of the Padma Shri in sports
Tamil sportspeople
Cricketers at the 1975 Cricket World Cup
Cricketers at the 1979 Cricket World Cup
Recipients of the Arjuna Award
College of Engineering, Guindy alumni
Cricketers from Chennai